Palpita stenocraspis is a moth in the family Crambidae. It is found in Kenya and South Africa.

References

Palpita
Moths described in 1898
Moths of Africa